Jonathon Andrew Lodwick (born 14 October 1989) is an English barrister and former first-class cricketer.

Lodwick was born at Reading in October 1989. He was educated at Dauntsey's School, before going up to Worcester College, Oxford. While studying at Oxford, he made a single appearance in first-class cricket for Oxford University against Cambridge University in The University Match at Oxford in 2010. From Oxford, Lodwick went on to St John's College at the University of Cambridge to complete his master's degree. While at Cambridge, Leighton played in the 2012 University Match for Cambridge. He took 7 wickets in the match and scored 32 runs. 

Lodwick studied law at City, University of London after graduating from Cambridge and was called to the bar as a member of the Inner Temple in July 2016.

References

External links

1989 births
Living people
sportspeople from Reading, Berkshire
People educated at Dauntsey's School
Alumni of Worcester College, Oxford
English cricketers
Oxford University cricketers
Alumni of St John's College, Cambridge
Cambridge University cricketers
Alumni of City, University of London
Members of the Inner Temple
English barristers